was a Japanese samurai of the Sengoku period, who served the Ryūzōji clan.

References

Samurai
1584 deaths
Year of birth unknown
Ryūzōji clan